The First Battle of Mora was part of the Taos Revolt of the Mexican–American War, between United States Army troops under Captain Israel R. Hendley, versus a militia of Hispanos (acting as Mexican nationals) and Puebloan allies in US-occupied northern New Mexico. The short skirmish took place on January 24, 1847, in and around the village of Mora, resulting in a US Army defeat and the death of Hendley and several of his men.

Background
The rebellion began in Don Fernando de Taos on January 19, 1847, with the assassination of Governor Charles Bent and a local sheriff, judge, and lawyer, followed by the January 20 killing of at least half a dozen defenders of a mill near Taos, and seven or eight American merchants traveling through Mora to Missouri..  Also on January 20, US Army Captain Israel R. Hendley of the Second Missouri Volunteers learned of the insurrection while in command of the grazing detachment along the Pecos River, and took possession of Las Vegas with 250 men, where the insurgents were beginning to gather. On January 22, Hendley learned that the insurgents had gathered a force of 150 or more men in Mora, where he headed with 80 of his men, the rest staying behind in Las Vegas.

Battle
On January 24, Hendley arrived in Mora and "found a body of Mexicans under arms, prepared to defend the town".  His men were attacked by the Mexicans who fired from the windows and loop-holes of their houses.  While pursuing the rebels into an old fort, Hendley was shot and killed.  Lacking artillery and senior leadership, the Americans then retreated, with 17 prisoners (to be tried for treason, as eastern New Mexico was nominally US territory under the US provisional government of New Mexico). Several other US Army personnel had been wounded, by the names of Waldo, Noyes, and Culver, among others, with around 25 of the opposing militia reported dead, an unknown number injured.

Lieutenant Colonel Philip St. George Cooke, of the US Army of the West, reported the battle thus:

Aftermath
It is unknown why Hendley chose to march with inferior numbers and no artillery against such a large force. As the Cooke quote indicates, there was a sense on the American side that the death of Hendley and his men was in some way an unprovoked injustice that had to be answered.

The Americans returned in force for revenge a week later. Under Capt. Jesse I. Morin, and with artillery, they razed the town to the ground on February 1 in the Second Battle of Mora.

See also
 Battles of the Mexican–American War
 List of battles fought in New Mexico

References

 
 
 

History of Mora County, New Mexico
January 1847 events
Battles of the Taos Revolt